Alistair Smith (born 8 August 1990) is an Australian rules footballer who played for the St Kilda Football Club in the Australian Football League (AFL). He currently plays for Perth in the West Australian Football League (WAFL).

AFL career 
Alistair Smith was recruited from Perth in the 2008 AFL Draft by St Kilda, with their fourth round selection (number 62 overall).

Smith played regularly with St Kilda's Victorian Football League (VFL) affiliate team Sandringham and spent 2009 and 2010 developing his career with the Zebras in the VFL.

Smith played three games in the 2010 NAB Cup. The young midfielder was impressive in St Kilda's first NAB Cup match—he had 18 possessions and was named in the Saints' best. Smith was named emergency six times during the home and away season in 2010.

Smith made his debut for St Kilda against  at Docklands Stadium on 10 April 2011, in round 3 of the 2011 AFL season. He gathered 16 disposals on debut.

Alistair Smith was delisted by St Kilda at the end of the 2011 season.

References

External links 
Alistair Smith's profile on the Official Website of the St Kilda Football Club

Living people
1990 births
St Kilda Football Club players
Sandringham Football Club players
Australian rules footballers from Western Australia
Perth Football Club players
People from Northam, Western Australia